Farhad ( farhād), also spelt Ferhaad or Ferhod, has been a Persian name for men since the Parthians, first recorded for Arsacid kings circa 170 BC.

Etymology
Modern Persian name Farhād is derived from Middle Persian Frahād (in  prht Frahāt; in  Phraatēs), ultimately from Old Iranian *fra-hāta- "merited, obtained".

Places
Farhad, Nishapur – a village in Nishapur County, Razavi Khorasan Province, Iran
Farhād Tarāsh – a rockface on Mount Behistun, Iran

Literature
 Farhad (Persian literature)

People with the given name Farhad 
Farhad I Phraates I of Parthia c. 176–171 BC
Farhad II Phraates II of Parthia c. 138–127 BC
Farhad III Phraates III of Parthia c. 70–57 BC
Farhad IV Phraates IV of Parthia c. 38–2 BC
Farhad V Phraates V of Parthia (Phraataces) c. 2 BC–AD 4
Farkhad Akhmedov, Russian businessman of Azerbaijani origin
Farhad Aliyev, Azerbaijani politician
Farhad Badalbeyli, Azerbaijani pianist and composer
Farkhat Bazarov, Russian footballer
Farhad Daftary, Ismaili scholar
Farhad Darya, Afghan singer
Farhad Fakhreddini, Iranian composer
Farhad Kazemi, Iranian football manager
Farhad Khan, Mughal Indian faujdar of Sylhet and Chittagong
Farhad Khoiee-Abbasi, public protester in Chicago
Farkhad Magametov, Uzbek footballer
Farhad Majidi, Iranian footballer
Farhad Manjoo, American journalist and author
Farhad Mazhar, Bangladeshi poet
Farhad Mehrad, Iranian singer
Farhad Moshiri, British-Iranian businessman
Farhad Rahbar, Iranian politician
Farhad Veliyev, Azerbaijani footballer

People with the surname Farhad 

 Ariful Kabir Farhad, Bangladeshi professional footballer
 Kamilla Farhad, Azerbaijani tennis player
 Maria Farhad, Iraqi beauty pageant winner
 Mohamed Farhad, Maldivian singer
 Mohammad Farhad, Bangladesh politician
 Massumeh Farhad, American curator and art historian
 Sayed Farhad, Kuwaiti judoka
 Shirin Farhad, disambiguation page
 Zafrul Hasan Farhad, Bangladeshi politician

See also
Phraates, the name of 5 kings in the Arsacid Empire

References

Persian masculine given names